Personalan is a Philippine television talk show broadcast by GMA News TV. Originally hosted by Ali Sotto, it premiered on July 25, 2011. The show concluded on October 18, 2013. Jolina Magdangal and Jean Garcia served as the final hosts. It was replaced by Love Hotline in its timeslot.

Hosts

 Ali Sotto 
 Jolina Magdangal 
 Jean Garcia

Accolades

References

2011 Philippine television series debuts
2013 Philippine television series endings
Filipino-language television shows
GMA News TV original programming
Philippine television talk shows